Danilo Telmo "Paco" Gerlo (born March 7, 1979) is an Argentine football utility defender.

Career
Gerlo started his career in the Argentine 2nd Division at Central Córdoba in Rosario in 2000. In 2002, he joined Quilmes and helped the team gain promotion to the Primera by beating Argentinos Juniors in an end of season promotion playoff. The next season saw Quilmes finish 4th and 6th scoring a total of 60 points leaving them well clear of relegation and in the qualifying places for the Copa Libertadores and the Copa Sudamericana.

Honours
River Plate
Argentine Primera División: 2008 Clausura
Arsenal
Argentine Primera División: 2012 Clausura

External links
 Statistics at Irish Times
 Argentine Primera statistics 

1979 births
Living people
People from Caseros Department
Argentine footballers
Argentine expatriate footballers
Association football defenders
Central Córdoba de Rosario footballers
Quilmes Atlético Club footballers
Club Atlético River Plate footballers
Real Unión footballers
Arsenal de Sarandí footballers
Unión de Santa Fe footballers
Argentine Primera División players
Expatriate footballers in Spain
Sportspeople from Santa Fe Province